Sloan Lake may refer to:

Sloan Lake (Colorado)
Sloan Lake (Minnesota)